Zaglik-e Kurbolagh (also Romanized as Zaglīk-e Kūrbolāgh; also known as  Zaklak-e Kūr Bolāgh) is a village in Qeshlaq Rural District, in the Central District of Ahar County, East Azerbaijan Province, Iran. At the 2006 census, its population was 223, in 40 families.

References 

Populated places in Ahar County